Demethylspheroidene O-methyltransferase (1-hydroxycarotenoid O-methylase, 1-hydroxycarotenoid methylase, 1-HO-carotenoid methylase, CrtF) is an enzyme with systematic name S-adenosyl-L-methionine:demethylspheroidene O-methyltransferase. This enzyme catalyses the following chemical reaction

 S-adenosyl-L-methionine + demethylspheroidene  S-adenosyl-L-homocysteine + spheroidene

In Rhodopseudomonas capsulata and Rubrivivax gelatinosus the enzyme is involved in biosynthesis of spheroidene.

References

External links 
 

EC 2.1.1